General elections were held in Jamaica on 15 December 1976. The result was a victory for the People's National Party, which won 47 of the 60 seats. Voter turnout was 85.2%.

Results

References

1976 in Jamaica
Elections in Jamaica
Jamaica